Velyka Babka is a village in Chuhuiv Raion (district) in Kharkiv Oblast of eastern Ukraine, at about  east from the centre of Kharkiv city. Velyka Babka belongs to Chuhuiv urban hromada, one of the hromadas of Ukraine.

References

Villages in Chuhuiv Raion